Frank John Leja Jr. (February 7, 1936 – May 3, 1991) was an American professional baseball player. The first baseman appeared in a total of 26 games with the New York Yankees (1954–55) and Los Angeles Angels (1962) of Major League Baseball.  

A native of Holyoke, Massachusetts, who starred at Holyoke High School, Leja was signed to a $45,000 bonus contract by legendary Yankee scout Paul Krichell. As a "bonus baby", the 18-year-old Leja was forced by the regulations of the day to spend the first two seasons of his professional baseball career on a Major League roster. Leja lone career hit was a single off Al Sima of the Philadelphia Athletics on September 19, 1954, in the Athletics' final game at Connie Mack Stadium before the team moved to Kansas City.

After finally being allowed to play regularly in minor league baseball, Leja showed his ability as a strong power hitter, exceeding the 20-home run mark from 1957 to 1959 and again in 1961, however, the Yankees never recalled him, then traded him to the St. Louis Cardinals after the 1961 season.  

He was traded to the Milwaukee Braves in May 1962 and finished his career in the minor leagues in 1963 with the Triple-A Toronto Maple Leafs of the International League.

Leja's single off Al Sima in Philadelphia was his only MLB hit in 23 official at bats, although he scored three runs.  

Leja died of a heart attack in Boston at age 55 and was interred in Greenlawn Cemetery in suburban Nahant, Massachusetts.

References

External links

1936 births
1991 deaths
Amarillo Gold Sox players
Baseball players from Massachusetts
Binghamton Triplets players
Charleston White Sox players
Los Angeles Angels players
Louisville Colonels (minor league) players
Major League Baseball first basemen
Nashville Vols players
New Orleans Pelicans (baseball) players
New York Yankees players
Richmond Virginians (minor league) players
Sportspeople from Holyoke, Massachusetts
Syracuse Chiefs players
Toronto Maple Leafs (International League) players
Winston-Salem Twins players